Provisions of the Representation of the People Act 1918 included reorganisation of representation in the House of Commons of the Parliament of the United Kingdom (Westminster), with new constituency boundaries being first used in the 1918 general election.

In Scotland the legislation defined 32 burgh constituencies, 38 county constituencies and one university constituency. One burgh constituency, Dundee, represented seats for two members of parliament (MPs), and the university constituency represented seats for three MPs. 

Each of the other constituencies elected one MP. Therefore, the legislation provided parliamentary seats for a total of 74 Scottish MPs.

Constituencies defined by this legislation were used also in the general elections of 1922, 1923, 1924, 1929, 1931, 1935 and 1945.

For the 1950 general election, new boundaries were introduced under the House of Commons (Redistribution of Seats) Act 1949.

Burgh constituencies

County constituencies

University constituency

Notes and references 

 1918
1918 establishments in Scotland
1950 disestablishments in Scotland
Constituencies of the Parliament of the United Kingdom established in 1918
Constituencies of the Parliament of the United Kingdom disestablished in 1950